The Biochemical Society is a learned society in the United Kingdom in the field of biochemistry, including all the cellular and molecular biosciences.

Structure
It currently has around 7000 members, two-thirds in the UK. It is affiliated with the European body, Federation of European Biochemical Societies (FEBS). The Society's current President (2016) is Sir David Baulcombe. The Society's headquarters are in London.

History
The society was founded in 1911 by Benjamin Moore, W.D. Halliburton and others, under the name of the Biochemical Club. It acquired the existing Biochemical Journal in 1912.

The society name changed to the Biochemical Society in 1913.

In 2005, the headquarters of the society moved from Portland Place to purpose-built offices in Holborn.

In 2009, the headquarters moved again to Charles Darwin House, near Gray's Inn Road.

Past presidents include Professor Ron Laskey, Sir Philip Cohen, and Sir Tom Blundell.

Awards
The society makes a number of merit awards, four annually and others either biennially or triennially, to acknowledge excellence and achievement in both specific and general fields of science. The annual awards comprise the Morton Lecture, the Colworth Medal, the Centenary Award and the Novartis Medal and Prize.

Publishing
The Society's wholly owned publishing subsidiary, Portland Press, publishes books, a magazine, The Biochemist, and several print and online academic journals:

Biochemical Journal 
Biochemical Society Symposium (online only)
Biochemical Society Transactions 
Cell Signalling Biology
Clinical Science
Essays in Biochemistry
Bioscience Reports

The Society's flagship publication, the Biochemical Journal,  celebrated its centenary in 2006 with the launch of a free online archive back to its first issue in 1906.

Further reading

References

External links
 Biochemical Society
 Portland Press
 Biochemical Journal Centenary

Biochemistry organizations
British biology societies
Biotechnology organizations
Chemistry societies
Molecular biology organizations
1911 establishments in the United Kingdom
Organisations based in the London Borough of Islington
Scientific organisations based in the United Kingdom
Scientific organizations established in 1911